Louisville is a city in Jefferson County, in the U.S. state of Kentucky. It is located at the Falls of the Ohio River.

Topography and geomorphology 

Although the soils and underlying rocks officially put Louisville in the outer Bluegrass region, the city's landscape is better described as being in a very wide part of the Ohio River flood plain. Louisville's part of the valley is located between two plateaus, the karst plateau of Southern Indiana and the Bluegrass plateau of Kentucky, both with an elevation of around 900 feet. Elevations drop off the Indiana plateau very sharply via the Muldraugh Escarpment, whereas the rise in elevation up to the Bluegrass plateau is more gradual.

The flood plain is much longer north to south than it is east to west. For example, within several miles of downtown, the Highlands sitting at 540 feet is out of the thousand-year flood plain, whereas areas 10 miles from downtown such as Fairdale and Okolona (both between seven and 11 miles from the river) have the same elevation as downtown Louisville. Most areas in the east end have an elevation from 600 to 700 feet, which, with the typically eastbound winds, trap in heat and pollutants.

Areas along and west of the south fork of Beargrass Creek (and more generally, I-65) are located where the Ohio River once ran, so the land here is very flat and is composed of harder rocks. Prior to urbanization much of this area was composed of wetlands, and early roads through these were made of wooden planks. This history is occasionally still readily evident in street names, for example, the spoke road Poplar Level, whose name describes its original construction on planks of poplar. 3rd Street was formerly called Central Plank Road for the same reason. As an industry, namely Standiford Field airport, moved into the area in the 1950s most creeks through the area were rerouted into ditches to alleviate the area's poor drainage and constant flooding.

Areas east of I-65 were generally not in the flood plain and thus are mostly gentle rolling hills composed of soft loess soils, hence the reason roads here (such as Eastern Parkway) are very prone to potholes. The southern quarter of Jefferson County is in the scenic and rugged Knobs region. This is the only part of Jefferson County to not have experienced any urbanization and is today almost entirely parkland for the Jefferson Memorial Forest. The eastern third is in the Eden Shale Hills section of the Bluegrass region and has also experienced less urbanization than the flood plain, although that is starting to change.

Political geography and population 

The Louisville-Jefferson County, KY-IN Metropolitan Statistical Area (MSA), the 43rd-largest in the United States, includes the Kentucky counties of Jefferson (coterminous with Louisville Metro), Bullitt, Henry, Meade, Nelson, Oldham, Shelby, Spencer and Trimble. The southern Indiana counties Clark, Floyd, Harrison and Washington are also included in the Louisville MSA.  This MSA is included in the Louisville-Elizabethtown-Scottsburg, KY-IN Combined Statistical Area (CSA), which also includes the Elizabethtown, KY MSA (composed of Hardin and LaRue Counties) as well as the Scottsburg, IN Micropolitan Statistical Area.

Louisville's Metro Area was expanded more than any other in the country during a March 2003 overhaul of U.S. Metropolitan Area statistics by the federal government. In the 2000 census, even very fast growing counties such as Spencer County weren't included. The Metro Area's ranking rose from 49th to 42nd, and the added Combined Statistical Area measured the area as the nation's 31st-largest. The total Metro area population also increased dramatically from just over 1 million to nearly 1.4 for the CSA.

Seventeen percent of the state's population lives in Jefferson County and 25% live in counties in the Louisville CSA, and also Jefferson County has two-and-a-half times more people than Kentucky's second-most populous county, Fayette County. Twelve of the 15 buildings in Kentucky over 300 feet are located in Downtown Louisville. Almost 40% of the population growth in Kentucky are in Louisville's CSA counties.

Climate 

Louisville has a humid subtropical climate (Köppen Cfa), typical of the Upper South, with four distinct seasons and is located in USDA hardiness zones 6b and 7a. Spring-like conditions typically begin in mid-to-late March, summer from mid-to-late-May to late September, with fall in the October–November period. Seasonal extremes in both temperature and precipitation are not uncommon during early spring and late fall; severe weather is not uncommon, with occasional tornado outbreaks in the region. Winter typically brings a mix of rain, sleet, and snow, with occasional heavy snowfall and icing. Summer is typically hazy, hot, and humid with long periods of  temperatures and drought conditions at times. Louisville averages 35 days a year with high temperatures at or above , and the average window for such temperatures on average fall on June 7 and September 10, respectively. The first and last measurable (≥) snowfalls of the season on average fall on December 8 and March 12, respectively.

The wettest seasons are spring and summer, although rainfall is fairly constant year round. During the winter, particularly in January and February, several days of snow can be expected.

A 2012 study by the Urban Climate Lab at Georgia Tech shows that Louisville has the highest index of the heat island effect in America. According to Brian Stone of the Urban Climate Lab and author of The City and the Coming Climate, "The average increase in the temperature difference between urban and rural environments in the Louisville area has been 1.67 degrees Fahrenheit every decade between 1961 and 2010. That's nearly double the rate of the next city on the list, Phoenix, which saw an average change of .96 degrees in the same period." Stone said that part of Louisville's problem stems from the unfortunate meteorological conditions of the Ohio River Valley, which is prone to stagnant air conditions but also that the lack of tree cover in the urban core contributes as well. Stone states that "The tree canopy downtown is one of the sparsest of any city I have seen in the country." The tree cover in Louisville's larger metro area is around 30 percent, according to Stone's research, with the urban core at just 10 percent. That compares to about 45 percent in the city of Atlanta.

Air pollution is trapped in Louisville's Ohio River Valley location. The city is ranked by Environmental Defense as America's 38th-worst city for air quality.

Louisville's lowest solar noon is 28.4 degrees with the shortest daylength being 9 hours and 30 seconds, both occurring from December 17–26. The city's highest solar noon is 75.2 degrees with the longest daylength being 14 hours and 39 seconds, both occurring from June 17–25. The city's March and September equinox occurs at 50.5 degrees.

See also 
 Cityscape of Louisville, Kentucky

Notes

References

Further reading

External links 
 Louisville/Jefferson County Information Consortium
 LOJIC interactive maps
 Metro Mapper - Interactive Maps for the Louisville Metro Area
 Historic Maps of Louisville/Jefferson County, Kentucky  — University of Louisville Libraries